Nelson County may refer to:

Places
 Nelson County, Western Australia
 Nelson County, Kentucky, U.S., originally Nelson County, Virginia (1784–92)
 Nelson County, North Dakota, U.S.
 Nelson County, Virginia, U.S. (established 1807)

Other uses
 a brand of Bourbon whiskey